James Burnes  (12 February 1801–19 September 1862) was a Scottish doctor and surgeon in India, who became physician-general of Bombay.

Life
Burnes was born on 12 February 1801 at Montrose, where his father James Burnes was Provost. He was a medical student at Edinburgh University, and London's Guy's Hospital and St Thomas's Hospital.

Burnes arrived in 1821 at Bombay, with his brother Alexander Burnes. After taking minor posts in the medical service, he was successful in the open competition for the office of surgeon to the residency of Cutch State, quite recently in the hands of the East India Company. The state was led by Deshalji II, a minor, and there was an incursion from Sindh that forced the British brigade to retire to Bhuj. Burnes accompanied, as a volunteer, the field force which in 1825 expelled the Sindians.

With a flattering invitation, Burnes then visited Hyderabad in Sindh. He undertook what was a diplomatic mission to the satisfaction of the British. In England on sick leave in 1834, he was made an LL.D. of Glasgow University and a Fellow of the Royal Society, and received the knighthood of the Royal Guelphic Order from William IV.

On his return to India in 1837, Burnes was appointed garrison surgeon of Bombay, then secretary of the medical board, superintending surgeon, and finally physician-general. He was also a member of the board of education, and took an interest in the medical training of Indians. Poor health led him to resign in 1849, after twenty-eight years' service.

On his return home, Burns occupied himself with the local affairs of Forfarshire, where he was a justice of the peace. He moved to London, England, and died there on 19 September 1862.

Freemasonry
Burnes became a Freemason in an English Lodge: Benevolent Lodge, No. 480, in 1828, (Bombay, [Mumbai] India). That Lodge no longer exists. When in Scotland in 1834, he was made an honorary member of Lodge St Peter, No. 120, (Montrose). On 30 April 1835 he was made an honorary member of Lodge Canongate Kilwinning, No. 2, (Edinburgh).

In 1836 he was appointed by the Grand Lodge of Scotland to be the Provincial Grand Master of Western India. His jurisdiction was later extended and he became Grand Master of all Scottish Freemasonry in India. During his term in office two Scottish Masonic Lodges were established. One by the name of Rising Star of Western India, No. 342, (Bombay) and the other, St Andrew-in-the-East, No. 343, (Poona, India). Both were granted Charters by the Grand Lodge of Scotland on 18 November 1844.

Works

A narrative of his visit to Sindh, sent in by Burnes as an official report to the resident at Cutch, was a contribution to the geography of India. It was published in book form, as Narrative of a Visit to Scinde, in 1830. He wrote also a Sketch of the History of Cutch (lithographed for private circulation, 1829), and a Sketch of the history of the Knights Templar.

Legacy
When Burnes left Bombay, medals were founded, to be competed for at the Grant Medical School, Bombay, the Montrose Academy, and the boys' and girls' schools at Byculla. Both Scottish Lodges founded during Burnes' term as Grand Master continue to meet in Mumbai and Pune, India, (2019).

Burns Road is named after him.

Family
Burnes married, in 1829, Sophia Holmes, daughter of Sir George Holmes, in Bombay; they had nine children. He married, as his second wife, Esther Pryce, in June 1862.

Honors 

 1835: Fellow of the Royal Society (FRS)
 Knight of the Royal Guelphic Order (KH)

Bibliography

References

External links
The Grand Lodge of Antient Free and Accepted Masons of Scotland.
Lodge Canongate Kilwinning, No. 2, (Edinburgh)
James Burnes Letters at Dartmouth College Library

Attribution

1801 births
1862 deaths
19th-century Scottish medical doctors
Scottish writers
Scottish Freemasons
Fellows of the Royal Society